Karni Singh Rathore (1953–2005) was a colonel in the Indian Army and recipient of the Kirti Chakra award.

Career

Col. Karni Singh Rathore was commissioned as an officer in the 7th Rajputana Rifles, in which his father had also served, and rose to command it. At the time of his death he was posted as a member of the Indian Territorial Army, having served previously with the Assam Rifles.

In 1985, he was awarded the Kirti Chakra, the second highest peacetime award for gallantry, in recognition of his service while fighting insurgents.

External links

1953 births
2005 deaths
People from Churu district
Military personnel from Rajasthan